Augustine H. Folsom (died 1926) or A.H. Folsom was a photographer in the Boston, Massachusetts-area in the late 19th and early 20th centuries. Subjects included buildings in Massachusetts, Maine, and Georgia. Folsom showed photographic work in the Massachusetts Charitable Mechanic Association exhibitions of 1874 and 1881. He lived in Roxbury, c. 1870–1926. Works by Folsom reside in the collections of the Boston Public Library; Historic New England; Metropolitan Museum, NY; Museum of Fine Arts, Boston; the Georgia State Archives; and the American Antiquarian Society.

References

Image gallery
Photographs by Augustine H. Folsom

Further reading

Illustrations by Folsom
 Ceremonies at the dedication of the Soldiers' monument: in Concord, Mass. Printed by B. Tolman, 1867. Includes illus. by Folsom. Google books
 George Augustus Wheeler. History of Castine, Penobscot, and Brooksville, Maine: including the ancient settlement of Pentagöet. Bangor, Maine: Burr & Robinson, 1875. Includes illus. by Folsom. Google books
 Edwin Start. Penobscot Bay. New England Magazine, July 1896. Includes illus. by Folsom. Google books

About Folsom
 Old wet-plate photographer. Boston Daily Globe, June 18, 1905
 E.B. Delabarre. Recent History of Dighton Rock. Publications of the Colonial Society of Massachusetts, Feb. 1919; p. 286+ Includes discussion of  Folsom's photo of Dighton Rock. Google books

External links

 WorldCat. Folsom, Augustine H.
 Boston Public Library on Flickr. Augustine H. Folsom Photographs
 Boston Latin Academy. Work by Folsom
 Concord Library. Work by Folsom
 Smithsonian. Work by Folsom in Warshaw Collection.
 Historic New England, 2003
 Historic New England, 2002
 Maine Memory. Westbrook Seminary and Female Collegiate Institute, 1868, by Folsom
 Maine Memory. http://www.mainememory.net/bin/Detail?ln=29225 Westbrook Seminary, 1868], by Folsom

Year of birth missing
1926 deaths
Photographers from Massachusetts
Artists from Boston
People from Roxbury, Boston
19th century in Boston
19th-century American photographers